Missouri Avenue is a major diagonal west–east thoroughfare in the Northwest quadrant of Washington, D.C.

History
Until 1946, Missouri Avenue was named Concord Avenue and was renamed for Harry S. Truman's home state of Missouri when he became president the year before. Previously, Missouri Avenue was the name of a street in the National Mall, which was demolished several years before.

Route
Missouri Avenue begins as an eastbound one-way road at the Joyce Road ramp and 17th Street NW for  before intersecting Military Road and becoming a 4-lane thoroughfare, continuing slightly southeast towards Georgia Avenue (US 29). Missouri Avenue makes a  curve south along Georgia Avenue and continues further southeast, eventually ending at North Capitol Street where the road continues northeast as Riggs Road, which leads into Maryland.

Major intersections

References

Streets in Washington, D.C.